Here you can find all the Swedish players that have appeared at least once for a team in Italy's Serie A. In Bold are the players still active in current season and their teams for this.

A
Marcus Allbäck – Bari – 1997–98
Andreas Andersson – Milan – 1997–98
Daniel Andersson – Bari, Venezia, Chievo, Ancona – 1998–2004
Kennet Andersson – Bari, Bologna, Lazio – 1995–2000
Kurt Andersson – Udinese, Varese – 1961–62, 1964–66
Sune Andersson – Roma – 1950–51
Mikael Antonsson – Bologna – 2011–14
Samuel Armenteros – Benevento – 2017–18
Jan Aronsson – Vicenza – 1956–58

B
Pär Bengtsson – Torino – 1949–50
Orvar Bergmark – Roma – 1962–63
Joachim Björklund – Vicenza, Venezia – 1995–96, 2001–02
Jesper Blomqvist – Milan, Parma – 1996–98
Rune Börjesson – Palermo – 1961–63
Tomas Brolin – Parma – 1990–95, 1996–97

C
Mervan Celik – Pescara – 2012–13
Dan Corneliusson – Como – 1984–89

D
Martin Dahlin – Roma – 1996–97

E
Ivar Eidefjäll – Legnano, Novara – 1951–52, 1953–56
Albin Ekdal – Juventus, Siena, Bologna, Cagliari, Sampdoria, Spezia – 2008–15, 2018–
Dan Ekner – Fiorentina, Spal – 1951–54
Emmanuel Ekong – Empoli – 2022–23
Joel Ekstrand – Udinese – 2010–12
Johnny Ekström – Empoli, Reggiana – 1986–88, 1993–94
Sebastian Eriksson – Cagliari – 2011–14

F
Alexander Farnerud – Torino – 2013–16
Ramon Filippini – Legnano – 1951–52
Erik Friberg – Bologna – 2013–14

G
Riccardo Gagliolo – Carpi, Parma, Salernitana – 2015–16, 2018–22
Gustav Gärd – Sampdoria – 1950–51
Andreas Granqvist – Genoa – 2011–13
Gunnar Gren – Milan, Fiorentina, Genoa – 1949–56
Samuel Gustafson – Torino – 2016–18
Bengt Gustavsson – Atalanta – 1956–58, 1959–61

H
Melker Hallberg – Udinese – 2014–15
Linus Hallenius – Genoa – 2012–13
Kurt Hamrin – Juventus, Padova, Fiorentina, Milan, Napoli – 1956–71
Magnus Hedman – Ancona – 2003–04
Filip Helander – Verona, Bologna – 2015–19
Isak Hien – Verona – 2022–
Oscar Hiljemark – Palermo, Genoa – 2015–19
Åke Hjalmarsson – Torino – 1949–50, 1951–52
Emil Holm – Spezia – 2022–
Hans Holmqvist – Cesena – 1988–90
Glenn Hysén – Fiorentina – 1987–89

I

Zlatan Ibrahimović – Juventus, Inter, Milan – 2004–09, 2010–12, 2019–
Klas Ingesson – Bari, Bologna, Lecce – 1995–96, 1997–2001
Svante Ingelsson – Udinese – 2017–19

J
Pontus Jansson – Torino – 2014–16
Hans Jeppson – Atalanta, Napoli, Torino – 1951–57
Torbjörn Jonsson – Fiorentina, Roma, Mantova – 1961–65, 1966–67

K
Emil Krafth – Bologna – 2015–18
Dejan Kulusevski – Atalanta, Parma, Juventus – 2018–22

L
Valentino Lai – Venezia – 2001–02
Lars Larsson – Atalanta – 1984–85
Nils Liedholm – Milan – 1949–61
Anders Limpar – Cremonese – 1989–90
Bengt Lindskog – Udinese, Inter, Lecco – 1956–62
Sigvard Löfgren – Lazio, Spal  – 1951–52, 1953–56
Teddy Lučić – Bologna – 1998–2000

M
Bror Mellberg – Genoa – 1950–51
Olof Mellberg – Juventus – 2008–09

N
Stellan Nilsson – Genoa – 1950–52
Bertil Nordahl – Atalanta – 1948–51
Gunnar Nordahl – Milan, Roma – 1948–58
Knut Nordahl – Roma – 1950–51

O
Joakim Olausson – Atalanta – 2013–14
Robin Olsen – Roma, Cagliari – 2018–20
Yksel Osmanovski – Bari, Torino – 1998–2003

P
Karl-Erik Palmér – Legnano, Juventus – 1951–52, 1953–54, 1958–59
Joakim Persson – Atalanta – 1996–97
Robert Prytz – Atalanta, Verona – 1988–90, 1991–92

Q
Robin Quaison – Palermo – 2014–17

R
Mathias Ranégie – Udinese – 2012–14
Marcus Rohdén – Crotone – 2016–18
Kjell Rosén – Torino, Novara – 1950–53

S
Nils-Åke Sandell – Spal – 1956–58
Stefan Schwarz – Fiorentina – 1995–98
Arne Selmosson – Udinese, Lazio, Roma – 1954–62
Ken Sema – Udinese – 2019–20
Aimar Sher – Spezia – 2021–22
Stefan Silva – Palermo – 2016–17
Lennart Skoglund – Inter, Sampdoria, Palermo – 1950–63
Glenn Strömberg – Atalanta – 1984–87, 1988–92
Stig Sundqvist – Roma – 1950–53
Mattias Svanberg – Bologna – 2018–22

T
Borje Tapper – Genoa – 1950–51
Jonas Thern – Napoli, Roma – 1992–97

V
Joel Voelkerling Persson – Lecce – 2022–

W
Christian Wilhelmsson – Roma – 2006–07

See also
List of foreign Serie A players
Foreign Serie A Footballer of the Year

Notes

References 

Italy
Serie A footballers
 Swed
 Serie A
Swedish expatriate footballers
Association football player non-biographical articles